In computer storage, multipath I/O is a fault-tolerance and performance-enhancement technique that defines more than one physical path between the CPU in a computer system and its mass-storage devices through the buses, controllers, switches, and bridge devices connecting them.

As an example, a SCSI hard disk drive may connect to two SCSI controllers on the same computer, or a disk may connect to two Fibre Channel ports.  Should one controller, port or switch fail, the operating system can route the I/O through the remaining controller, port or switch transparently and with no changes visible to the applications, other than perhaps resulting in increased latency.

Multipath software layers can leverage the redundant paths to provide performance-enhancing features, including dynamic load balancing, traffic shaping, automatic path management, and dynamic reconfiguration.

See also 
 Device mapper
 Linux DM Multipath

External links 
 Linux Multipathing, Linux Symposium 2005 p. 147
 VxDMP white paper, Veritas Dynamic Multi pathing
 Linux Multipath Usage guide

Computer data storage
Computer storage technologies
Fault-tolerant computer systems